Ethirigal Jakkirathai is a 1967 Indian Tamil-language spy thriller film produced and directed by R. Sundaram under Modern Theatres. The script was written by A. L. Narayanan, with music by Vedha. The film stars R. S. Manohar, with Ravichandran, L. Vijayalakshmi, Thengai Srinivasan, V. S. Raghavan, Manimala, Ammukutty Pushpamala and Master Prabhakar in supporting roles. It was released on 11 August 1967.

Plot 

Dinathayalan is a rich and respectable man that has financially and emotionally helped orphan siblings Raj and Prabha. He also arranges for his only son Baskar to marry Prabha as the two are in love. Raj's work as a police inspector pits him against Dinathayalan, who retaliates. Raj is pushed into a corner and makes increasingly questionable decisions isolating him from his family. Prabha and Baskar's wedding is also called off. The lovers work to reunite the families and help Raj.

Cast 
 R. S. Manohar as Inspector Raj/No.31
 Ravichandran as Dr. Baskar
 L. Vijayalakshmi as Prabha
 Thengai Srinivasan as Tondiarpettai Minor Dass
 V. S. Raghavan as Dinathayalan
 Manimala as Lakshmi
 Ammukutty Pushpamala as Pushpa
 Master Prabhakar as Kannan
 C. L. Anandan as Diraviyam
 Thanjai Ashokan as Mannikam
 Pakkirisamy as Sekar
 Vijayalalitha as Club dancer

Soundtrack 
Music was composed by Vedha and lyrics were written by Kannadasan. The songs "Nerukku Ner" and "Aha Aha Indru" are based on "O Mere Sona Re" and "Aaja Aaja Main Hoon Pyar" respectively, both from the 1966 Hindi film Teesri Manzil.

Reception 
Kalki positively reviewed the film for not relying heavily on distractions often associated with the genre, and Srinivasan's performance.

References

Bibliography

External links 
 

1960s spy thriller films
1960s Tamil-language films
1967 films
Fictional portrayals of the Tamil Nadu Police
Films about organised crime in India
Indian black-and-white films
Indian spy thriller films